Blue System was a German pop group that was founded by Dieter Bohlen in 1986 after the break-up of Modern Talking.

Career 
The group consisted of Dieter Bohlen (mastermind creator, composer, writer, producer, mixer, arranger and verse main vocals), and hired backstage musicians Rolf Köhler (chorus main vocals), Michael Scholz (background vocals), Detlef Wiedeke (background vocals) and other background and/or front female voices Tuti Kanta ("Laila", "Only with You"), Marion Schwaiger ("Déjà vu", etc.), Audrey Mountang and Madeleine Lang .

On stage: Joachim Vogel (rhythm guitar), Jeanne Dupuy and Frank Otto (drums), Nadja Abd el Farrag (vocals). In 1988 Frank Otto was replaced by Michel Rollin. After that in 1991 a new keyboardist joined for live shows – Achim Strieben. In TV shows and videos he was replaced by Friedrich Graner (Sir Fritz), who remained a part of the group until the break-up in 1998. In 1992 Dirk Sauer, Rene Engelman and Wolfgang Fritsch joined the group, while Joachim Vogel left.

Some of the group's singles such as "Sorry Little Sarah" or "My Bed Is Too Big" achieved moderate success in Europe. The group released 22 video clips from their album repertoire and most of these were aired in Europe, especially on German TV shows. Blue System also had several concert performances in Russia during the late 80s and early 90s.

List of band members 

 Dieter Bohlen – lead vocals, guitar, keyboards (1986–1998)
 Frank Otto – drums (1986–1989)
 Joachim Vogel – rhythm guitar (1986–1990)
 Husnu Baylav (Snoopy) – drums (1989)
 Michel Rollin – drums (1989–1998)
 Joachim Strieben – keyboards (1989–1998)
 Lutz Krüger – vocals (1990–1991)
 Wolfgang Fritsch – rhythm guitar (1990–1996)
 Fritz Graner – keyboards (1991–1998)
 Dirk Sauer – vocals (1992–1994)
 Thorsten Feller – vocals (1994–1996)
 Lars Illmer – vocals (1997–1998)

Timeline

Discography

Studio albums 

 1987 Walking on a Rainbow (Hansa Records)
 1988 Body Heat (Hansa Records) [No. 23 Austria, No. 20 Germany]
 1989 Twilight [No. 30 Austria, No. 26 Switzerland, No. 11 Germany]
 1990 Obsession [No. 18 Austria, No. 14 Germany]
 1991 Seeds of Heaven [No. 12 Austria, No. 11 Germany]
 1991 Déjà vu [No. 18 Germany, No. 27 Austria]
 1992 Hello America [No. 29 Germany, No. 21 Austria]
 1993 Backstreet Dreams [No. 5 Germany, No. 22 Austria]
 1994 21st Century [No. 11 Germany]
 1994 X – Ten [No. 24 Germany]
 1995 Forever Blue [No. 18 Germany]
 1996 Body to Body [No. 29 Germany]
 1997 Here I Am [No. 38 Germany]

Singles

See also 
 Modern Talking
 Euro disco
 Systems in Blue

References

External links 
 
 
 http://www.bohlenworld.de/ (Dieter Bohlen fansite)

1986 establishments in West Germany
1998 disestablishments in Germany
German Eurodance groups
German synthpop groups
Musical groups established in 1986
Musical groups disestablished in 1998
Musical groups from Hamburg
Eurodisco groups
Hansa Records artists
ZYX Music artists
Bertelsmann Music Group artists